Rohini Kuner (born 28 July 1970 in Bombay) is an Indian-born German pharmacologist and director of the Institute of Pharmacology at Heidelberg University.

Vita 
After studying pharmacology in India she obtained her PhD from University of Iowa in the laboratory of Gerald Gebhart studying the role of spinal NMDA-receptors in nociception.

From 1995 she was a Postdoc with Peter Seeburg at Heidelberg University. In 2002 she started her own lab through the Emmy Noether Program of the German Research Council. Since 2006 she is the chair for molecular pharmacology at Heidelberg University.

Since 2015 she heads the collaborative research center "SFB 1158: From nociception to chronic pain".

Rohini Kuner is married to the German neuroscientist Thomas Kuner. In October 2018 she was elected as member of the Heidelberg University Council.

Research 
She aims at understanding molecular mechanisms underlying chronic pain resulting from long-lasting inflammation or cancer. A major focus is laid on addressing signalling mechanisms which underlie activity-dependent changes in primary sensory neurons transmitting pain (nociceptors) and their synapses in the spinal dorsal horn. Her current work spans molecular, genetic, behavioural, electrophysiological and imaging approaches in vitro as well as in vivo in rodent models of pathological pain.

Awards 
2019: Member of the German Academy of Sciences Leopoldina
 2018: Phoenix Prize for Pharmacology and Clinical Medicine
2018: Feldberg Foundation Prize
 2017: HMLS Investigator Award
 2017: Novartis Award for Therapy-Related Research
 2015: Novartis Award
 2012: ERC Advanced Grant
 2010: Pat Wall International Young Investigator Award, International Association for the Study of Pain
 2007: Pain Research Award, German Society for the Study of Pain
 2007: Ingrid-zu-Solms-Science Award
 2006: Chica and Heinz Schaller Award
 2006: Bergius-Kuhn-Meyerhof-Young Researcher Award (Heidelberg Roatry Club)
 2005: Rudolf-Buchheim-Award of the German Society for experimental and clinical Pharmacology and Toxicology

References

External links 
 DFG-Entry Rohini Kuner
 Portrait in Pain Research Forum
 Webseite of the Pharmacology Institute, Universitätsklinikum Heidelberg
 Webpage in the  Molecular Medicine Partnership Unit, EMBL
 Universität Heidelberg, Portrait
 Entry in Heidelberg Interdisciplinary Center for Neuroscience, IZN 
 Portrait in the excellence cluster Cell Networks, Uni Heidelberg
 Profile on Academia.net
 Webpage of the Collaborative Research Center SFB 1158

1970 births
Academic staff of Heidelberg University
Scientists from Mumbai
German pharmacologists
Members of the European Molecular Biology Organization
Living people
Members of the German Academy of Sciences Leopoldina